The Green Bay Phoenix men's soccer team is a National Collegiate Athletic Association Division I college soccer team composed of student-athletes attending the University of Wisconsin–Green Bay. The Phoenix play their home matches at the newly constructed turf field, Festival Foods Field at Aldo Santaga Stadium, as of 2018.  Like most of the other Green Bay Phoenix athletic teams, the men's soccer team competes in the Horizon League of the National Collegiate Athletic Association.

They have advanced to the NCAA Division I Tournament twice, in 1983 and 2009. They have also sent players to the pros in recent years, such as alumni Tosaint Ricketts and Kyle Ihn.

Home ground 

Festival Foods Field at Aldo Santaga Stadium is a soccer-specific stadium in Green Bay, Wisconsin, on the campus of the University of Wisconsin–Green Bay. It is part of the new Kress Family Outdoor Recreation Complex. Completed in 2018, the turf field is home to the UW–Green Bay men's and women's soccer teams.

The previous soccer complex, the original Aldo Santaga Stadium, was located on the UWGB campus's East Circle Drive. The old stadium sits on land once occupied by the number one fairway at Shorewood Country Club. The flood lights were once set up at Lambeau Field.

Team management 

Coaching Staff

References

External links 
 

 
Green Bay Phoenix
1969 establishments in Wisconsin